Hornby Castle may refer to the following castles in England:

 Hornby Castle, Lancashire
 Hornby Castle, North Yorkshire